Vincenzo "Vicente" Mecozzi (1909 in Frascati, Italy - 1964 in São Paulo, Brazil) was a Brazilian decorator, professor and painter born in Italy.

Along with father Arnaldo Mecozzi, he was noted for his work in Brazil. They worked on buildings such as the Igreja do Imaculado Coração de Maria of São Paulo.

References

Brazilian painters
1909 births
1964 deaths
People from Frascati
Italian emigrants to Brazil
20th-century Italian painters
Italian male painters
20th-century Italian male artists